Kommuna is  a submarine salvage ship in service with the Russian Navy's Black Sea Fleet and the world's oldest active duty naval vessel.  A double-hulled catamaran, she was laid down at the Putilov Factory (now the Kirov Factory) in St. Petersburg in November 1912 as Volkhov. The ship was launched the following year, and commissioned on 14 July 1915.  She was renamed Kommuna on 31 December 1922.  Kommuna has served in the Russian Imperial, Soviet, and Russian Federation navies through the Russian Revolution and two World Wars.

History
The ship was the first Russian double-hulled vessel, and was developed by order of the Naval General Staff. SMS Vulkan was used as prototype.

The contract to build the ship was won by the Putilov company, who received Order No. 3559 from the General Directorate of Shipbuilding on 30 December 1911, and the contract for construction was signed on 5 May 1912. The ship was laid down on 12 November 1912 under the supervision of naval architect N.V. Lesnikova. On 17 November 1913 the ship was launched under the name Volkhov, and was commissioned into the Baltic Fleet on 15 July 1915.

Volkhov was initially based at Reval where she served as a submarine tender, capable of carrying 10 spare torpedoes and 50 tons of fuel, as well as accommodation for 60 submariners. She serviced Russian submarines, and also British E and C-class submarines.

Volkhov made her first successful salvage of a submarine in the summer of 1917, raising the Amerikanskiy Golland (Holland)-class submarine , which had sunk off Åland.

From late 1917 Volkhov participated in the Civil War, serving the submarines of the Soviet Baltic Fleet, and on 31 December 1922 (just days after the founding of the USSR) she was renamed Kommuna. Under her new name she continued in service in the Baltic, extinguishing a fire aboard the submarine Zmeya, and raising the despatch boat Kobchik, and the boat Krasnoarmeyets. Kommuna continued to serve as a salvage and repair ship, also raising a tug, a torpedo boat, and a crashed aircraft.

Following the German invasion in June 1941 Kommuna was based at Leningrad, and although damaged by bombing continued to serve throughout the siege. In March 1942 she recovered four KV tanks, two tractors and 31 vehicles from Lake Ladoga, which had fallen through the ice road, called the "Road of Life", which was Leningrad's only supply route. That year she also repaired six M-class submarines, as well as salvaging the  411, the tugboat Austra, the schooners Trud and Vodoley-2, and several other vessels. In February 1943, the crew of Kommuna were sent to the Volga where they recovered the tug Ivan and an Ilyushin Il-2 aircraft. In 1944, Kommuna recovered 14 wrecks, totalling 11,767 tons, and repaired 34 ships. Following the end of the siege the entire crew were awarded the Medal "For the Defence of Leningrad". The ship continued to serve after the war, and in 1954 she was refitted and her engines were replaced by more modern Dutch ones.

In 1967, the ship sailed from the Baltic to the Black Sea, and was refitted at a cost of 11 million rubles to carry submersibles.

In 1984 the ship was laid up for transfer to the Russian Academy of Sciences. However, the transfer was cancelled, and she was thoroughly looted, and had to be completely refitted before returning to Naval service. In 1999 she was re-designated from "salvage ship" to "rescue ship". 

As of January 2012 she forms part of the detachment of rescue vessels based at Sevastopol.

In April 2022, during the Russian invasion of Ukraine, the ship was deployed after the sinking of the guided missile cruiser Moskva. The size of the Moskva, which sank in one piece, makes bringing it to the surface impractical. Kommuna will reportedly assist in recovering weapons, bodies, and other sensitive material that foreign powers might be interested in.

References

External links

1913 ships
Ships built in Saint Petersburg
Ships of the Imperial Russian Navy
Auxiliary ships of the Soviet Navy
Auxiliary ships of the Russian Navy
Ships involved in the 2022 Russian invasion of Ukraine